Edwin Cockrell is a paralympic athlete from the United States competing mainly in category F44 shot put events.

Edwin has twice competed in the Paralympics in 2000 and in 2004 where he won a silver medal in the combined F44/46 category.

References

External links
 

Paralympic track and field athletes of the United States
Athletes (track and field) at the 2000 Summer Paralympics
Athletes (track and field) at the 2004 Summer Paralympics
Paralympic silver medalists for the United States
Living people
Medalists at the 2004 Summer Paralympics
Year of birth missing (living people)
Paralympic medalists in athletics (track and field)
American male shot putters
Shot putters with limb difference
Paralympic shot putters